The Big Night In was a British telethon that was broadcast by BBC One from 7 pm to 10 pm on 23 April 2020 to support those affected by the COVID-19 pandemic. It is the first joint initiative between two BBC telethon charities, Children in Need and Comic Relief. By the end of the programme, over £27.3 million had been raised. The British government promised to match all public donations if the minimum of £20 million was reached.

Personnel 
The telethon's showrunner and executive producer for the BBC was Peter Davey. The presenters, using The One Show'''s studio in Broadcasting House, London, included Lenny Henry, with Matt Baker and Davina McCall for the first hour and Zoe Ball and Paddy McGuinness from 8 pm.  They maintained social distancing, while everyone else appearing live took part remotely, via video links. There were pre-recorded comedy appearances by Steve Coogan, Rob Brydon, Jack Whitehall, Catherine Tate, Romesh Ranganathan, Miranda Hart and others, as well as solo music performances from Sam Smith and Celeste.

Prince William, Duke of Cambridge made a surprise appearance, in a sketch with Stephen Fry, shown just before the 8 pm Clap for Our Carers.

 Line-up 
Featured performances included:
 Miranda Hart and the cast of Miranda. Sam Smith performing "Lay Me Down"
 A lockdown sermon by The Vicar of Dibley featuring Dawn French
 Tess Daly and Claudia Winkleman's Strictly Come Dancing choreography challenge
 Stephen Fry as Lord Melchett (Blackadder), in conversation with Prince William, Duke of Cambridge
 Catherine Tate and David Tennant in "Lauren the 'Am I Bovvered' teenager gets home-schooled" (a sequel to a skit the two made for the 2007 Comic Relief telethon)
 Premiere of the video for Live Lounge Allstars' cover version of Foo Fighters' "Times Like These"
 Romesh Ranganathan's Isolation Diary
 A virtual EastEnders pub quiz hosted by Ian Beale (Adam Woodyatt) with a crossover appearance from Coronation Streets Liz McDonald (Beverley Callard)
 Actors who have played the title role in Doctor Who (original and new series) saluting NHS health workers
 Little Mix offering a prize of a backstage visit to their new TV show, Little Mix: The Search Matt Lucas and the BBC Concert Orchestra performing "Thank You Baked Potato"
 Sports stars undertaking the "spin challenge"
 Celeste performing a cover of Bill Withers' "Lean On Me"
 Jack Whitehall in Bad Education with Matthew Horne and Anthony Joshua
 Peter Kay and the British public remake the "Is This the Way to Amarillo" video
 Joe Wicks' exercise secrets
 The cast of People Just Do Nothing on a video call, in character
 Stand-up at home from Jason Manford, Rosie Jones, Tim Vine, Tez Ilyas, Dane Baptiste, Russell Kane, Lost Voice Guy, Nish Kumar and more
 Steve Coogan and Rob Brydon in The Trip David Walliams, Matt Lucas, Anthony Head, Ruth Jones and the voice of Tom Baker in the first televisual Little Britain'' sketches for over a decade
 Liam Payne, Olly Murs, Leona Lewis, Nicole Scherzinger, Freya Ridings, Katherine Jenkins, Alfie Boe, Gregory Porter, Andrew Lloyd Webber and more join Gary Barlow to perform "Sing"

There were also appearances from Jenna Coleman, Tim Cook, Judi Dench, Sting, Rishi Sunak and others, with some repeating the UK government's directives for behaviour during the lockdown.

References

External links 
 
 
 

COVID-19 pandemic in the United Kingdom
Children in Need
Comic Relief
BBC Television shows
British telethons
2020 in British television
2020 establishments in the United Kingdom
English-language television shows
2020 British television series debuts
Charity events in the United Kingdom
Charitable activities related to the COVID-19 pandemic
Television shows about the COVID-19 pandemic
April 2020 events in the United Kingdom
2020 television specials